N'ssi N'ssi is a studio album from Algerian raï artist Khaled, produced by Don Was and Philippe Eidel.

It includes the songs "N'ssi, N'ssi," "Chebba," and "Abdel Kader," which are among Khaled's most famous, and "Alech Taadi" which was used in the film The Fifth Element. The lyrics are in Arabic except for a few occasional French words.

The album has attained gold-level certification by the Syndicat National de l'Edition Phonographique.

In the US, the album was released by Cohiba/Mango/Island/PolyGram Records. In 2005, Universal Music licensed the album for release in the UK and USA to Wrasse Records.

Track listing 
All songs written by Hadj Brahim Khaled except where noted.

 "Serbi Serbi" – 6:18
 "Kebou" – 4:53
 "Adieu" (Hadj Brahim Khaled, Kada Mustapha) – 5:34
 "Chebba" (Hadj Brahmi Khaled, Safy Boutella) – 5:39
 "Les ailes" – 4:54
 "Alech Taadi" – 4:09
 "Bakhta" – 5:11
 "N'ssi N'ssi" (Hadj Brahim Khaled, Kada Mustapha) – 3:30
 "Zine A Zine" – 4:44
 "Abdel Kader" – 6:08
 "El Marsem" – 4:58

References 

Khaled (musician) albums
1993 albums
Albums produced by Don Was
Barclay (record label) albums
Mango Records albums
Wrasse Records albums
Albums produced by Philippe Eidel